Bellina Logan is an American television and film actress.

She is known for her roles in such films and television shows as Interview with the Vampire,  Twin Peaks and as Nurse Kit in ER and Janice Mayfield in the sitcom Daddio.

She portrayed the recurring character of Fiona in Sons Of Anarchy.

References

External links

American television actresses
Living people
African-American actresses
American film actresses
Year of birth missing (living people)
21st-century African-American people
21st-century African-American women